The 2nd cabinet of executive ministers of Turkey (24 January 1921 – 19 May 1921 ) was the second government formed by the nationalists during the Turkish War of Independence. The Republic was not yet proclaimed and the government was called  ("cabinet of executive ministers").

Background 
The chairman of the cabinet (equivalent to prime minister) was Fevzi Pasha (later named Çakmak) who also acted as the Minister of Defense.  Both Fevzi Pasha and the other members of the cabinet were elected by the parliament one by one.

The government
In the list below, the name in parathesis is the surname the cabinet members assumed later.(see Surname Law of 1934).

References

1921 establishments in the Ottoman Empire
1921 disestablishments in the Ottoman Empire
Turkish War of Independence
Pre-Republic Turkey